The Holmdel and Keyport Turnpike was a turnpike in New Jersey, running south from Holmdel Township to Keyport, between 1859–1901. It then became part of the county highway system. Since 1937, it has been part of County Route 4.

The Holmdel and Keyport Turnpike was chartered March 9, 1859. In 1937, it became a part of County Route 4.

See also
List of turnpikes in New Jersey

References

Holmdel Township, New Jersey
Transportation in Monmouth County, New Jersey
Roads in New Jersey